VNREDSat-1 (short for Vietnam Natural Resources, Environment and Disaster Monitoring Satellite, also VNREDSat-1A) is the first optical Earth Observing satellite of Vietnam; its primary mission is to monitor and study the effects of climate change, predict and take measures to prevent natural disasters, and optimise the management of Vietnam's natural resources.

Satellite
The VNREDSat-1 was built in Toulouse by EADS Astrium. During the project 15 Vietnamese engineers were integrated and trained by the Astrium team. The VNREDSat-1 system is based on the Astrium operational AstroSat100 satellite, used for the SSOT programme developed with Chile or the ALSAT-2 satellite system developed with Algeria. The 120 kg satellite will image at 2.5 m in panchromatic mode and 10 m in multi-spectral mode (four bands) with a 17.5 km swath, and will orbit at 600–700 km in a sun synchronous orbit.

Launch
The satellite was launched from ELV at the Guiana Space Centre by the Vega VV02 rocket at 02:06:31 UTC on 7 May 2013 together with the PROBA-V and ESTCube-1 satellites.

References

2013 in Vietnam
Spacecraft launched in 2013
Earth imaging satellites
Satellites of Vietnam
Spacecraft launched by Vega rockets